Christopher Shannon Penn (October 10, 1965 – January 24, 2006) was an American actor. He was the brother of actor Sean Penn and musician Michael Penn. Noted as a skilled character actor from a prominent acting dynasty, he was typically cast as a tough character, featured as a villain or a working-class thug, or in a comic role and was known for his roles in such films as The Wild Life, Reservoir Dogs, The Funeral, Footloose, Rush Hour, Corky Romano, True Romance, Beethoven's 2nd, Short Cuts, The Boys Club, All the Right Moves, At Close Range, Pale Rider, and Starsky & Hutch. During his career Penn had won the Volpi Cup for Best Actor for his performance in The Funeral. He also provided the voice of the corrupt, ruthless cop Edward "Eddie" Pulaski in the video game Grand Theft Auto: San Andreas.

Penn was found dead in his apartment on January 24, 2006, at the age of 40. An autopsy revealed the primary cause for his death was "nonspecific cardiomyopathy" (heart disease).

Early life
Penn was born in Los Angeles, California, to Leo Penn, an actor and director, and Eileen Ryan (née Annucci), an actress. His paternal grandparents were Jewish immigrants from Lithuania and Russia, and his mother was a Catholic of Italian and Irish descent. His older brothers are actor Sean Penn and musician Michael Penn.

Career
Penn started acting at the age of 12 at the Loft Studio and made his film debut in 1979's Charlie and the Talking Buzzard, starring Christopher Hanks. In 1983, he was featured in Francis Ford Coppola's youth drama Rumble Fish and appeared in the high school football drama All the Right Moves as the best friend of Tom Cruise's character. He also appeared in the hit dance movie Footloose in 1984 as the best friend of Kevin Bacon's character; played a villain in the Clint Eastwood western Pale Rider (1985); and co-starred with his brother Sean Penn and mother Eileen Ryan in At Close Range (1986).

Penn, who had a black belt in karate, appeared in the 1989 motion picture Best of the Best as Travis Brickley, a cocky member of the U.S. Taekwondo team taking on the team from Korea. The film also starred James Earl Jones, Sally Kirkland, Eric Roberts, Phillip Rhee, and Simon Rhee. Penn reprised his role in 1993's Best of the Best 2.

1990s
Two of his more memorable performances were in Reservoir Dogs as Nice Guy Eddie and True Romance as Nicky Dimes (both characters in scripts written by Quentin Tarantino). In 1996 he won the award for Best Supporting Actor at the Venice Film Festival for The Funeral.

In 1990, Penn was cast in a season one episode of The Young Riders. He appeared as a villain and was killed by Josh Brolin's character James Butler "Jimmy" Hickok. In Robert Altman's 1993 ensemble film Short Cuts, Penn played a troubled swimming pool cleaner who is disturbed by his wife's profession (a telephone sex worker who takes calls from clients at home) to which Penn's character is sometimes obliged to listen. 

In 1995, he played a confused highway patrolman searching for a car with three drag queens (played by Patrick Swayze, Wesley Snipes, and John Leguizamo) in To Wong Foo, Thanks for Everything! Julie Newmar.

Penn appears in Jay-Z's 1998 music video "Can I Get A..." as a bartender who mixes drinks and dances. He also played the character Clive Cod in the 1998 film Rush Hour.

2000s
In 2001, Penn was meant to appear in American Pie 2 as Steve Stifler's father, but his scenes were eventually cut as there was insufficient time to include him in the film's plot. However, they appeared on the deleted scene reel on the DVD release. Penn then went on to co-star opposite Peter Berg as the mafia brothers of Corky in Corky Romano. He also appeared as a fall guy in a criminal conspiracy in Murder by Numbers, alongside Sandra Bullock.

In 2003, he appeared on the Will & Grace episode "Fanilow", as Barry Manilow's tour director and a character who is interested romantically in Will. Penn was featured in an episode of the television crime drama Law & Order: Criminal Intent ("Death Roe") during the 2004–2005 season. He was also featured on the 2004 video game Grand Theft Auto: San Andreas as the voice of crooked officer Eddie. Penn played himself on a 2005 episode of the HBO series Entourage. He appeared in The Darwin Awards, which premiered at the Sundance Film Festival the day after his death.

Death
Penn was found dead in his Santa Monica apartment on January 24, 2006, at the age of 40. An autopsy and subsequent toxicology report performed by a Los Angeles County medical examiner revealed the primary cause of death was heart disease. The report also noted that the prescription drug promethazine with codeine and an enlarged heart were possible contributing factors to his death. The toxicology report revealed that Valium, morphine, marijuana and an elevated level of codeine were found in his bloodstream. Penn gained considerable weight throughout the 1990s. Sean Penn said in an interview on Larry King Live that his brother probably died because of his weight.

Penn's gravesite is at Holy Cross Cemetery in Culver City, California.

Filmography

Film

Television

Music videos

Video games

References

External links
 
 

1965 births
2006 deaths
20th-century American male actors
21st-century American male actors
American male film actors
American male child actors
American people of Irish descent
American people of Italian descent
American people of Lithuanian-Jewish descent
American people of Russian-Jewish descent
American male television actors
American male video game actors
Burials at Holy Cross Cemetery, Culver City
Drug-related deaths in California
Deaths from cardiomyopathy
Male actors from Los Angeles
Male actors from Santa Monica, California
Volpi Cup for Best Actor winners
Volpi Cup winners